Herbert Funk Goodrich (July 29, 1889 – June 25, 1962) was a United States circuit judge of the United States Court of Appeals for the Third Circuit. He was also Dean of the University of Pennsylvania Law School.

Education and career

Born on July 29, 1889, in Anoka, Minnesota, Goodrich received an Artium Baccalaureus degree in 1911 from Carleton College and a Bachelor of Laws in 1914 from Harvard Law School. He was a faculty member at the State University of Iowa (now the University of Iowa) from 1914 to 1922, as an instructor in law from 1914 to 1915, an Assistant Professor from 1915 to 1919, Professor from 1919 to 1921 and as Acting Dean of the State University of Iowa College of Law (now the University of Iowa College of Law) from 1921 to 1922. He was a Professor of Law at the University of Michigan from 1922 to 1929.

He was a faculty member at the University of Pennsylvania Law School from 1929 to 1948. He served as Dean and Professor of Law from 1929 to 1940, Vice President from 1931 to 1940, and as a lecturer in law from 1940 to 1948.

Federal judicial service

Goodrich was nominated by President Franklin D. Roosevelt on March 5, 1940, to a seat on the United States Court of Appeals for the Third Circuit vacated by Judge Francis Biddle. He was confirmed by the United States Senate on May 7, 1940, and received his commission on May 10, 1940. His service terminated on June 25, 1962, due to his death.

Other service

Goodrich served as the Director of the American Law Institute and chaired the drafting committee for the original version of the Uniform Commercial Code. He would remain Director of the institute until his death.

References

Sources
 

|-

Judges of the United States Court of Appeals for the Third Circuit
United States court of appeals judges appointed by Franklin D. Roosevelt
20th-century American judges
1889 births
1962 deaths
Harvard Law School alumni
Deans of law schools in the United States
American legal scholars
Carleton College alumni
University of Pennsylvania Law School faculty
Deans of University of Pennsylvania Law School
People from Anoka, Minnesota
University of Michigan Law School faculty
University of Iowa College of Law faculty
Scholars of contract law